Bavarian A IV engines were German 2-2-2 steam locomotives with the Royal Bavarian State Railways (Königlich Bayerische Staatsbahn).

The vehicles were developed for night journeys and operations on the North-South Railway. In order to increase the area of the evaporator, the boiler was increased in length to 3,080 mm and in diameter to 1,219 mm. In addition, the weight and the boiler overpressure were raised. These were the first engines to have an outside frame with outside cylinders. This class was used widely, especially in south Germany and in Austria. All the engines bar one were retired by 1883. The survivor was initially converted to a 0-6-0, and later a 0-4-2 wheel arrangement.

They were coupled to 3 T 5 tenders.

See also
 List of Bavarian locomotives and railbuses

2-2-2 locomotives
A IV
Standard gauge locomotives of Germany
Railway locomotives introduced in 1852
Maffei locomotives
1A1 n2 locomotives
Passenger locomotives